Michele S. Mirman (born June 1, 1953) is a Brooklyn trial lawyer specializing in accidents, medical malpractice, and construction accidents in the New York State and Federal Courts. She has an active member of the New York State Bar for over 42 years, and is known for winning the then-highest verdict in the U.S. for a female attorney on behalf of a rape victim at $4 million in 1985.

In 2017, Mirman was elected as the president of the Brooklyn Women's Bar Association (BWBA) by existing board members and is the immediate past president. She is also delegate to the Women's Bar Association of the State of New York (“WBASNY”).

In 2019, Mirman was named president of the New York State Trial Lawyers Association (NYSTLA). She is listed in City & States "The 2018 Women Power 100", a list of the 100 most powerful women in New York.

Education 
Mirman graduated from James Madison High School in 1970, and shortly thereafter, earned her bachelor's degree from Sarah Lawrence College in 1973. She graduated from Antioch School of Law in 1976.

Career 
After law school, Mirman moved to Brooklyn and began working at Spatt & Bauman, P.C. where she tried commercial and personal injury cases. In 1980, she became an associate at Mirman & Associates, then a partner in Michele S. Mirman, P.C. in 1991 before becoming founder and Senior Partner at Mirman, Markovits & Landau, P.C. in 1992.

In 2017, she was elected president of the Brooklyn Women's Bar Association. She is also Delegate to the Women's Bar Association of the State of New York, where she serves on the judiciary committee, which rates New York State Judicial candidates.

On June 20, 2019, Mirman was named president of the New York State Trial Lawyers Association. Mirman is the sixth woman in the organization's 65-year history to be elected with the title of president.

Board and community involvement 
Founder and President of Brooklyn Women's Bar Foundation.
Brooklyn Bridge Park Conservancy – Trustee
Lower East Side Tenement Museum of New York – Board of Trustees
 Allinbklyn – Women's Giving Circle
 Brooklyn Kindergarten Society
 The Making Headway Foundation

Bibliography

Articles 

 Mirman, Michele (September 2, 2019). "New York leads the way in protecting workers' rights". Crains New York. Retrieved September 3, 2019.
 Mirman, Michele (August 9, 2019). "Equifax Data Breach Highlights Corporations’ Troubling Use of Mandatory Arbitration and Need for Reform". Gotham Gazette. Retrieved September 4, 2019.

References 

American lawyers
1953 births
Living people